Lothar Meyer (1 August 1933 – 1 September 2002) was a German footballer. He played in 16 matches for the East Germany national football team from 1954 to 1961.

References

External links
 

1933 births
2002 deaths
East German footballers
East Germany international footballers
Place of birth missing
Association footballers not categorized by position